Kittu Suresh (27 February 1945 – 6 January 2010) was an Indian cricketer who played in twenty-three first-class matches for Mysore between 1966 and 1972.

References

External links
 

1945 births
2010 deaths
Indian cricketers
Karnataka cricketers
Place of birth missing